Events from the year 1737 in art.

Events

Paintings
 Pompeo Batoni – The Triumph of Venice
 Canaletto – St. Mark's and the Campanile, Venice (National Gallery of Canada, Ottawa)
 William Hogarth – The Good Samaritan
 Charles Parrocel – Halt of the King's Mounted Grenadiers
 Charles-André van Loo – The Grand Turk Giving a Concert to his Mistress
 Richard Wilson – The Inner Temple after the Fire of 4th January 1736/7

Births
 February 24 – Étienne Dantoine, French sculptor (died 1809)
 May 22 – Tethart Philipp Christian Haag, German-born Dutch portrait artist (died 1812)
 June 9 – Hendrik-Jozef Antonissen, Dutch landscape painter (died 1794)
 August 10 – Anton Losenko, Ukrainian-Russian Neoclassical painter who specialized in historical subjects and portraits (died 1773)
 August 11 – Joseph Nollekens, English sculptor, founder member of the Royal Academy (died 1823)
 September 15 – Jacob Philipp Hackert, landscape painter (died 1807)
 September 30 – Magdalene Bärens, Danish still life painter (died 1808)
 October 14 – José del Castillo, Spanish painter and a leader of the artistic movement "Illustrious Absolutism" (died 1793)
 October 30 – Niclas Lafrensen, Swedish genre and miniature painter (died 1807)
 November 7 – Johann Eleazar Zeissig, German genre and portrait painter, porcelain painter and engraver (died 1806)
 date unknown
 Philippe Curtius, wax modeller (died 1794)
 John Donaldson, Scottish miniature painter in enamel and water-colours (died 1801)
 Antonio Diziani, Italian painter of veduta, landscapes, and vistas (died 1797)
 Christopher Hewetson, Irish sculptor (died 1798)
 Carlo Giuseppe Ratti, Italian art biographer and painter (died 1795)

Deaths
 January 22 – Jean-Baptiste van Mour, Flemish-French painter (born 1671)
 March 17 – Hugh Howard, Irish portrait-painter and collector of works of art (born 1675)
 April 12 – Giovanni Battista Foggini, Italian sculptor of small bronze statuary (born 1652)
 June 4 – François Lemoyne, French  rococo painter (born 1686)
 October 13 - Bernhard Vogel, German engraver (born 1683)
 December 3 – Giovanni Battista Tagliasacchi, Italian painter of historical scenes and portraits (born 1697)
 date unknown
 Francisco Bustamante, painter (born 1680)
 Evaristo Muñoz, Spanish painter (born 1684)
 Francesco Penso, Venetian sculptor (born 1665)

References

 
Years of the 18th century in art
1730s in art